Bruno Fabiano Alves (born 16 April 1991), known as Bruno Alves, is a Brazilian professional footballer who plays as a centre-back for Grêmio, on loan from São Paulo FC.

Club career

Figueirense
Born in Jacareí, São Paulo, Bruno Alves graduated from Figueirense's youth setup, and made his senior debuts while on loan at Portuguese side G.D. Ribeirão, in 2011. Another loans subsequently followed, and he represented Metropolitano, Barretos, São José-SP and CRAC.

Alves was included in the main squad of Figueira in 2014, but only made his professional debut on 10 May of the following year, starting and being sent off after committing a penalty in a 1–4 away loss against Sport Recife for the Série A championship. He then subsequently became a regular starter for the club, suffering relegation in 2016.

São Paulo
On 21 August 2017, Alves signed a three-and-a-half-year contract with São Paulo in the top tier.

Honours

Club
São Paulo
Campeonato Paulista: 2021

Grêmio
Campeonato Gaúcho: 2022
Recopa Gaúcha: 2022

Individual
Campeonato Paulista Team of the Year: 2019

References

External links
 
 
 

1991 births
Living people
People from Jacareí
Footballers from São Paulo
Brazilian footballers
Association football defenders
Figueirense FC players
G.D. Ribeirão players
Clube Atlético Metropolitano players
Barretos Esporte Clube players
São José Esporte Clube players
Clube Recreativo e Atlético Catalano players
São Paulo FC players
Grêmio Foot-Ball Porto Alegrense players
Segunda Divisão players
Campeonato Brasileiro Série A players
Campeonato Brasileiro Série B players
Campeonato Brasileiro Série C players
Brazilian expatriate footballers
Brazilian expatriate sportspeople in Portugal
Expatriate footballers in Portugal